The Dutch Eerste Divisie in the 1995–1996 season was contested by 18 teams. AZ won the championship. This was the first year teams earned three points for a win instead of two.

New entrants
Relegated from the 1994–95 Eredivisie
 Dordrecht '90
 MVV

Final ranking

Promotion/relegation play-offs
In the promotion/relegation competition, eight entrants (six from this league and two from the Eredivisie) entered in two groups. The group winners were promoted to the Eredivisie.

Group 1

Round 1

Round 2

Round 3

Round 4

Round 5

Round 6

Group 2

Round 1

Round 2

Round 3

Round 4

Round 5

Round 6

See also
 1995–96 in Dutch football
 1995–96 Eredivisie
 1995–96 KNVB Cup

References
Netherlands - List of final tables (RSSSF)
SC Cambuur Archive

Eerste Divisie seasons
2
Neth